Charles H. McNabb was an American politician from Maryland. He served in the Maryland House of Delegates, representing Harford County, from 1914 to 1916.

Early life
Charles H. McNabb was born to Sarah Ellen (née Savin) and J. Martin McNabb. His father was a lawyer and member of the Maryland legislature. He attended St. John's College in Annapolis, Maryland, on a scholarship. He graduated in 1898 with a Bachelor of Arts. He was a member of the track team. McNabb was admitted to the bar.

Career
McNabb was a Democrat. He was elected as a member of the Maryland House of Delegates, representing Harford County, from 1914 to 1916.

Personal life
McNabb lived in Cardiff, Maryland.

References

Year of birth missing
Year of death missing
People from Cardiff, Maryland
St. John's College (Annapolis/Santa Fe) alumni
Democratic Party members of the Maryland House of Delegates
Maryland lawyers